"Chick Fit" is a song performed by English-Canadian girl group All Saints from their third studio album Studio 1. It was released as the second and final single from the album on 26 February 2007. The release was originally planned to include a two-part CD single but that was cancelled due to the poor sales of Studio 1 and a fall-out between All Saints and their label Parlophone Records. "Chick Fit" was then released as a digital-only single instead. The song was co-written by group member Shaznay Lewis in collaboration with the song's producer Rick Nowels. The song is lyrically influenced by feelings of feminism and infatuation.

Despite the lack of a physical release, "Chick Fit" achieved charting success in Slovakia, where it peaked at number 26. The song was accompanied by a music video which was directed by Daniel Wolfe and released on 18 January 2007. The video features the American street dance, Krumping.

All Saints performed the song on a T4 Special and Popworld, and on various other television shows and at several gigs around the United Kingdom.

Background
On 15 January 2007, All Saints announced on their official website that "Chick Fit" was going to be released as the second single from Studio 1 on 26 February 2007. Following the poor sales of Studio 1 All Saints were en route to being dropped by their label Parlophone Records before "Chick Fit" was released. The single release was later cancelled and at the same time not supported by radio stations. Parlophone then decided to release "Chick Fit" as a promotional, download-only single to cut costs following the poor performances of All Saints' Studio 1 and fellow labelmate Robbie Williams' Rudebox.

Chart performance
In week six of 2007, "Chick Fit" debuted at number 73 in Slovakia before dropping out the chart the following  week. It then re-entered the chart in week eight of 2007 at number 56 before climbing 30 places to reach a peak of number 26 the following week. In its fourth and fifth weeks on the chart it dropped to number 43, and then to number 82 respectively. In week 12 of 2007, it climbed six places to number 76. "Chick Fit" spent a total of six weeks on the chart.

Music video
"Chick Fit" was accompanied by a music video which was directed by Daniel Wolfe. The video features scenes of an American street dance called Krumping. Contactmusic.com said the video "sees the girls doing what they do best – singing infectious harmonies, looking cool and having fun!" In 2011, Rebecca Schiller from NME included the video at number 38 on their list of 50 Worst Music Videos Ever, stating that "as with most pop acts, All Saints signed out with a whimper rather than a bang, as the final drops of anything that might have been special dribbled out of them. [...] [the video] saw the girls in their JJB finest getting vaguely friendly with some rent-a-crunkers and demolish a cheap drum kit somewhere in the CD:UK studio. They had a good innings, and this was them way, way past their prime".

Charts

References

2007 singles
2006 songs
Wikipedia requested audio of songs
Songs with feminist themes
All Saints (group) songs
Songs written by Shaznay Lewis
Songs written by Rick Nowels
Song recordings produced by Rick Nowels